The men's horizontal bar competition was one of eight events for male competitors in artistic gymnastics at the 1988 Summer Olympics in Seoul. The qualification and final rounds took place on September 18, 20 and 24th at the Olympic Gymnastics Hall. There were 89 competitors from 23 nations, with nations competing in the team event having 6 gymnasts and other nations having up to 3 gymnasts. There were ties for both gold and bronze medals. The Soviet Union took two golds, as Vladimir Artemov and Valeri Liukin finished even at the top spot; they were the Soviets' first gold medals in the horizontal bar since 1968, and moved the Soviet Union past the United States and Switzerland into second most all-time golds in the event (after Japan with six). Bronze medals went to Holger Behrendt of East Germany and Marius Gherman of Romania, the first medal in the event for both nations. It was the first time since 1964 that Japanese gymnasts competed but did not win the event.

Background

This was the 17th appearance of the event, which is one of the five apparatus events held every time there were apparatus events at the Summer Olympics (no apparatus events were held in 1900, 1908, 1912, or 1920). Only one of the eight finalists from 1984 returned: fourth-place finisher Lou Yun of China. Dmitry Bilozerchev of the Soviet Union was the reigning (1987) world champion, with the rest of the worlds podium consisting of Canadian Curtis Hibbert (silver), East German Holger Behrendt, and Hungarian Zsolt Borkai (the latter two tied for bronze).

Chinese Taipei made its debut in the men's horizontal bar. The United States made its 15th appearance, most of any nation; the Americans had missed only the inaugural 1896 event and the boycotted 1980 Games.

Competition format

Each nation entered a team of six gymnasts or up to three individual gymnasts. All entrants in the gymnastics competitions performed both a compulsory exercise and a voluntary exercise for each apparatus. The scores for all 12 exercises were summed to give an individual all-around score. These exercise scores were also used for qualification for the apparatus finals. The two exercises (compulsory and voluntary) for each apparatus were summed to give an apparatus score. Half of the preliminary score carried over to the final. The 1984 Games had expanded the number of finalists from six to eight. Nations were still limited to two finalists each. Others were ranked 9th through 89th.

Schedule

All times are Korea Standard Time adjusted for daylight savings (UTC+10)

Results

Eighty-nine gymnasts competed in the horizontal bar event during the compulsory and optional rounds on September 18 and 20. The eight highest scoring gymnasts advanced to the final on September 24. Each country was limited to two competitors in the final. Half of the points earned by each gymnast during both the compulsory and optional rounds carried over to the final. This constitutes the "prelim" score.

References

Official Olympic Report
www.gymnasticsresults.com

Men's horizontal bar
Men's 1988
Men's events at the 1988 Summer Olympics